was a Japanese ophthalmologist, surgeon and amateur astronomer.

He is credited by the Minor Planet Center with the discovery of 17 asteroids at the Karasuyama Observatory between 1986 and 1992, all of which were co-discovered with Japanese astronomer Takeshi Urata, except for his lowest numbered discovery 3394 Banno. The inner main-belt asteroid 5484 Inoda was named in his honor on 1 September 1993.

References 
 

1955 births
2008 deaths
20th-century Japanese astronomers
Discoverers of asteroids

Japanese ophthalmologists